Daniel Padilla is the self-titled EP under Star Records released on May 27, 2012, in the Philippines in CD and Digital formats. It also became available in iTunes, Amazon and the Philippines' official music downloading cite, My Music Store Philippines, same day of physical distribution release.

The album topped all major music and video retailers in the Philippines both in physical and digital distribution, despite of initial doubts to release an album for Padilla. Some people even questioned the decision to release early on. But the album still managed to sell 8,000 copies in just a week of release and received gold certificate by PARI. In addition, the album turned platinum (15,000) after a month of selling. The consistency of strong sales continued that cause it to stay couple of months in top 20 of ‘’Odyssey’’ and ‘’Astroplus’’ according to Star Records Insider. As of February 2013, the album was certified double platinum.

Background
The first recording session of making the album was turned into surprise when Padilla walked in the recording studio on time at exactly 8:30pm, straight from taping. Padilla and Jonathan Manalo first recorded ‘’tinatago-tago ako’’. But Manalo said, instead of going into the booth and recording. Padilla requested him twice to play first the song referring to the demo recording of Rivermaya.  Padilla sang the whole song, but made helpful suggestions on how the arrangements could be made to better suit his voice. Adding that ‘’this is a kid who knows his music’’, Manalo said. However, notions on how this records were driven the fan? Manalo added, Daniel is not totally lacking of vocal or musical skills. Padilla is more on influenced by Orient Pearl sound yet he brought young flavor on it, observed by him. Further, he knows his strengths in music and possesses good musical ears that fits him to define flat and sharp.

Singles
The first commercial and digital single released from the album was ‘’Hinahanap-Hanap Kita’’ on April 20, 2012. It is originally recorded by Rivermaya. This became a mainstream hit in radios, receiving heavy rotation of airplay and being able to enter most top 5 of radio stations’ chart. It was also used as one of the theme songs of ABS-CBN's television series, Princess and I, in which he had a lead role alongside Kathryn Bernardo. Aside from that, it was adopted as well for a television commercial of Whisper. Part of its promotion run. After four months, he released the second single called, ‘’Prinsesa’’, that accompanied with a music video directed by Galileo Te released on September 24, 2012. ‘’Prinsesa’’ music video was peaked number 1 in Myx and same strength as the first single received in airplay. It also nominated in Myx Music Awards 2013 for ‘’Favorite Remake’’ but lost to Sarah Geronimo's Bakit Pa Ba?.

Reception
This album won 26th Awit Awards for Best Selling Album of The Year.

Track listing

 It included minus one versions on each track.

Personnel
 Malou N. Santos & Roxy Liquigan – executive producers
 Rox B. Santos – over-all album producer
 Jonathan Manalo – audio content head
 Roxy Liquigan – star adprom head
 Gina Mauricio-Joyce – star adprom oic for audio
 Zyra Cuenco – promo specialist
 Marivic Benedicto – star song, inc and new media head
 Beth Faustino – music publishing officer
 Eaizen Almazan – new media technical assistant
 Jan Michael Ibañez – project coordinator
 Andrew Castillo – creative head
 Caryl de Jesus – album layout designer

Certifications

References

2012 EPs
Daniel Padilla albums
Star Music EPs